Vargar is a village in Jaber-e Ansar Rural District, in the Central District of Abdanan County, Ilam Province, Iran. At the 2006 census, its population was 45, in 13 families.

References 

Populated places in Abdanan County